Pascal Payen-Appenzeller (born 13 May 1944) is Franco-Swiss historian, poet and writer. His father was French and his mother was the Swiss daughter of the Swiss-German pastor and printer Friedrich Appenzeller.

Sources
Listing; Bibliothèque nationale de France

20th-century French historians
20th-century French poets
French people of Swiss descent
1944 births
Living people
21st-century French historians
21st-century French poets
20th-century French male writers
21st-century French male writers
French male poets
French male non-fiction writers